The 1998 FIVB Volleyball Men's World Championship qualification was a qualification event, played in 1997 and 1998, for the thirteenth edition of Men's World Championship, which was held in Japan. The event was split into several groups divided by continent.

Confederation qualification processes
The distribution by confederation for the 1998 FIVB Volleyball Men's World Championship was:

 Asia and Oceania (AVC): 5 places (+ Japan qualified automatically as host nation for a total of 6 places)
 Africa (CAVB): 2 places
 Europe (CEV): 11 places
 South America (CSV) 2 places
 North America (NORCECA): 3 places

Africa
8 national teams originally entered qualification but Malawi, Liberia and Côte d'Ivoire withdrew, Cameroon was later added to Pool B.

Pool A
Venue:  Tunis, Tunisia
Dates: November 14–16, 1997

|}

|}

Pool B
Venue:  Kano, Nigeria
Dates: September 26–28, 1997

|}

|}

Asia-Pacific
12 national teams entered qualification but Bahrain and Philippines withdrew. Top two teams from Pool C and D and Pool E winner qualified to the World Championship.

Pool C
Venue:  Jeddah, Saudi Arabia
Dates: October 3–5, 1997

|}

|}

Pool D
Venue:  Tehran, Iran
Dates: December 17–19, 1997

|}

|}

Pool E
Venue:  Tashkent, Uzbekistan
Dates: December 12–14, 1997

|}

|}

Europe
28 national teams entered qualification. The teams were distributed according to their position in the FIVB Senior Men's Rankings. Teams ranked 1–15 automatically qualified for the second round.

Sub Pool a
Venue: Home and Away
Dates: April 26 – June 12, 1997

|}

|}

Sub Pool b
Venue:  Lille, France
Dates: June 27–29, 1997

|}

|}

Sub Pool c
Venue:  Istanbul, Turkey
Dates: April 30 – May 2, 1997

|}

|}

Sub Pool d
Venue:  Debrecen, Hungary
Dates: June 6–8, 1997

|}

|}

Pool F
Venue:  Montecatini Terme, Italy
Dates: August 8–10, 1997

|}

|}

Pool G
Venue:  Groningen, Netherlands
Dates: August 22–24, 1997

|}

|}

Pool H
Venue:  Olsztyn, Poland
Dates: August 15–17, 1997

|}

|}

Pool I
Venue:  Sofia, Bulgaria
Dates: August 22–24, 1997

|}

|}

Pool J
Venue:  Athens, Greece
Dates: December 20–22, 1997

|}

|}

Pool K
Venue: Home and Away
Dates: June 14 – December 28, 1997

|}

|}

Norceca

Pool L
Venue:  Havana, Cuba
Dates: February 6–8, 1998

|}

|}

Pool M
Venue:  San Antonio, United States
Dates: January 29 – February 1, 1998

Preliminary round

|}

|}

Final

|}

Final standing

Playoff
Venue:  Mexico City, Mexico
Dates: February 28 – March 1, 1998

|}

|}

South America
4 national teams entered qualification.

Pool N
Venue:  Santa Fe, Argentina and  Rio de Janeiro, Brazil
Dates: September 5–21, 1997

|}

|}

References

Complete Results

External links
 Results

W
W
FIVB Volleyball Men's World Championship
FIVB Volleyball World Championship qualification